Stonea railway station is a former railway station serving the small village of Stonea, Cambridgeshire. Although the station closed in 1966, the line is still in use.

References

External links
 Stonea station on navigable 1946 O. S. map

Disused railway stations in Cambridgeshire
Former Great Eastern Railway stations
Railway stations in Great Britain opened in 1847
Railway stations in Great Britain closed in 1966
1847 establishments in England
Fenland District